Sophus Tromholt (2 June 1851 – 17 May 1896) was a Danish teacher, astrophysicist and an amateur photographer. He worked as a teacher at Tanks School in Bergen, Norway 1876-82. In 1882 he was granted a scholarship by the Danish and Norwegian states to study the northern lights (Aurora Borealis). During the first International Polar Year 1882/83, he established a scientific northern lights centre in Kautokeino. His Northern lights studies  pioneered the modern Northern lights science. In 2013 UNESCO'S Memory of the World Register included the Sophus Tromholt Collection.

Photo collection
During his stay in Northern Norway he photographed - apart from the scientific project - the landscape and the Sami people. His character portraits of the Sami are of high aesthetic quality artistically and as ethnographic photography.  The photo collection is owned by the University of Bergen Library, Special collections, and consists of 231 glass negatives and 189 albumen prints in a portfolio: Sophus Tromholt: Billeder fra Lappernes Land. Tableaux du Pays des Lapons. 1883.

Legacy
Fifteen of the photos of the Sophus Tromholt Collection are still part of a display at the University of Bergen's Stein Rokkan Building. (The display is at the street level of the building's facade, since 2013.)

Biography
Tromholt, Sophus: Under the rays of the Aurora Borealis. London 1885
Larsen, Peter og Lien, Sigrid: Norsk Fotohistorie. Fra daguerrotypi til digitalisering.  2007. (Norwegian history of photography. From daguerreotype to digitising.)
Moss, Kira and Stauning, Peter: "Sophus Peter Tromholt: an outstanding pioneer in auroral research", Hist. Geo Space Sci., 3, 53-72, 2012. doi:10.5194/hgss-3-53-2012. 
Stauning, Peter: "Danish auroral science history", Hist. Geo Space Sci., 2, 1-28, 2011. doi:10.5194/hgss-2-1-2011. www.hist-geo-space-sci.net/2/1/2011/

References

External links
 
 Norsk fotosamling tatt opp i Verdens dokumentarv
 The Picture Collection, University of Bergen Library

1851 births
1896 deaths
19th-century Danish astronomers
Danish photographers
Danish expatriates in Norway